Myeongil Station is a subway station on Seoul Subway Line 5 in Gangdong-gu, Seoul.

Station layout

References

Railway stations opened in 1995
Seoul Metropolitan Subway stations
Metro stations in Gangdong District